Mr. Bungle is the debut studio album by American experimental rock band Mr. Bungle. It was released on August 13, 1991, through Warner Bros. Records. The album contains many genre shifts which are typical of the band, and helped increase the band's popularity, gaining them a cult following.

Content 

The album cover features artwork by Dan Sweetman, originally published in the story, "A Cotton Candy Autopsy" in the DC Comics/Piranha Press imprint title Beautiful Stories for Ugly Children.

The album mixes a variety of musical styles, including ska, circus music, heavy metal, free jazz, and funk. AllMusic called it a "dizzying, disconcerting, schizophrenic tour through just about any rock style the group can think of, hopping from genre to genre without any apparent rhyme or reason, and sometimes doing so several times in the same song." The website described Mike Patton's lyrics as "even more bizarrely humorous than those he used in Faith No More", and "also less self-censored". At the time, the band's label Warner promoted the record as being Mike Patton's "seriously weird new project".

The lyrics in the album are broad in themes, ranging from more comedic tones to dark and sexual references. "Slowly Growing Deaf" was "inspired by the ironic need to wear earplugs while listening to music and also people’s inability to listen", according to bassist Trevor Dunn, and also marked as the first song in the "Sleep" trilogy, with parts two and three being featured on the band’s second album. "Squeeze Me Macaroni" is a song featuring strong sexual themes being illustrated through food metaphors. "Egg" is about asociality. "Stubb (A Dub)" is about Trey Spruance's dog, Stubb. "The Girls of Porn" is about pornography and masturbation. "Love is a Fist" is about domestic violence. "Dead Goon" is about an asphixiophile, whose actions leads to the narrator’s death due to asphixiation.

Quotes from David Lynch's 1986 film Blue Velvet are strewn throughout the album.

Critical reception and legacy 

The album received mixed reviews upon release. Entertainment Weekly gave the album a negative review, writing "Adjectives like 'puerile' and 'unlistenable' take on entirely new dimensions when applied to Mr. Bungle". Trouser Press called it "one of the most ambitiously random, fractious records in recent memory" and "one of the finest records of its kind".

In 2015, Korn guitarist James "Munky" Shaffer praised the album, stating "I loved their last album, California, but their self-titled debut had the biggest impact on me. There’s a song on there called "Love Is a Fist" that's fucking crushing. That set the tone for us and what we went on to do creatively. They were completely outside the box and just didn't care – they satisfied only themselves. It wasn't about record sales, it was just about creating a band."

Mike Portnoy, former drummer of progressive metal band Dream Theater named Mr. Bungle as one of his 10 favorite progressive rock albums of all time, as he wrote "It actually scared the shit out of me the first time I heard it. I literally had never heard anything that twisted and evil and joyful. It was just the most bizarre hour I had ever spent listening to music."

Synyster Gates, from the hard rock band Avenged Sevenfold, named the album as "one of the most incredible pieces of music [he] has ever heard in [his] life". In 2021, Incubus vocalist Brandon Boyd stated that he was a fan of the album when it was first released, remarking that he loved how "irreverent and disgusting and scary the music was."

Track listing 
All songs credited to Mr. Bungle. Actual writers below, according to ASCAP.

Three more songs ("Mr Nice Guy", "Thunderball" and "Platypus") were also recorded for the album, but were cut at the last minute: "Platypus" later appeared on the band's second album, Disco Volante.

Personnel 
Credits adapted from the album's liner notes.

Mr. Bungle
 Mike Patton – vocals, keyboards, production (credited as 'Vlad Drac')
 Trey Spruance – guitars, keyboards, production (credited as 'Scummy')
 Trevor Dunn – bass, production (credited as 'Trevor Roy Dunn')
 Clinton McKinnon – tenor saxophone, production (credited as 'Bär')
 Theo – alto saxophone, baritone saxophone, production (credited as 'Theobald Brooks Lengyel')
 Danny Heifetz – drums, production (credited as 'Heifetz')

Additional personnel
 Yeesus Krist – backing vocals
 Maximum Bob – backing vocals
 Kahli – backing vocals
 Jennifer – backing vocals
 David Shea – turntables
 John Zorn – alto saxophone on "Love Is a Fist", production

Technical personnel
 Matt Murman – engineering assistance, digital editing
 David Bryson – engineering, mixing
 Bob Ludwig – mastering
 Troy Blakely – management 
 Stan Diamond – legal representation
 Kristin Yee – band management
 Anthony Lee – album sleeve design
 Lisa Wells – band logo typeset
 David Louapre – album cover and interior art
 Dan Sweetman – cover and interior art
 Jay Marshall – cover and interior art
 P. Earwig – inside double panel art

References

External links 

 

1991 debut albums
Albums produced by John Zorn
Funk metal albums
Mr. Bungle albums
Ska punk albums
Third wave ska albums
Warner Records albums